The chief of the boat (COB) is an enlisted sailor on board a U.S. Navy submarine who serves as the senior enlisted advisor to both the Commanding Officer (CO) and Executive Officer (XO).

Overview 
The COB assists with matters regarding the good order and discipline of the crew and is the equivalent of a Command Master Chief (CMDCM) or Command Senior Chief (CMDCS) in shore and surface commands. The COB is typically the most senior enlisted person. However, the commanding officer is neither required to select the most senior in grade or in time aboard, nor is he or she required to select the highest-ranking sailor. Likewise, the COB is not necessarily replaced when a more senior rate sailor reports aboard.

The selection process for a COB starts with the commanding officer's recommendation, which goes to the Naval Military Personnel Command via the squadron commander. Nominees are interviewed by other COBs. A COB also requires graduation from Senior Enlisted Academy.

When a new enlisted sailor joins a boat's crew, the COB is usually one of the first people the new sailor will meet. Although the role of COB is outside the direct chain of command, the COB has tremendous responsibility.

See also 
Fleet Master Chief Petty Officer (FLTCM)
Force Master Chief Petty Officer (FORCM)

Sources 
Navy Enlisted Manpower and Personnel Classifications and Occupational Standards Manual, Volume II, NAVPERS 18068F, which is the official manual for Navy Enlisted Classifications (NECs).
The Bluejackets Manual, current edition, United States Naval Institute, Annapolis, Maryland